Hebecnema is a genus of true flies of the family Muscidae.

Species
H. anthracina Stein, 1908
H. fulva (Bigot, 1885)
H. fumosa (Meigen, 1826)
H. nigra (Robineau-Desvoidy, 1830)
H. nigricolor (Fallén, 1825)
H. umbratica (Meigen, 1826)
H. vespertina (Fallén, 1823)

References

Muscidae
Diptera of Europe
Diptera of North America
Brachycera genera